Jastrebnik is a small dispersed settlement in the hills southwest of Šmartno pri Litiji in central Slovenia. The area is part of the historical region of Lower Carniola. The Municipality of Šmartno pri Litiji is now included in the Central Slovenia Statistical Region.

References

External links
Jastrebnik at Geopedia

Populated places in the Municipality of Šmartno pri Litiji